Kinkerbuurt is the neighborhood in Amsterdam, Netherlands. Along with the Overtoombuurt, it is part of the neighborhood of Oud-West in the borough of Amsterdam-West. It was built at the beginning of the twentieth century when Amsterdam was being expanded. Kinkerstraat, the area's main shopping street, was named after Dutch poet and lawyer Johannes Kinker.

The borough administration distinguishes several smaller areas within the Kinkerbuurt: the Bellamybuurt, the Van Lennepbuurt and the Da Costabuurt.

References

External links
 Kinkerbuurt 
 Kinkerbuurt Online 

Amsterdam-West
Neighbourhoods of Amsterdam